Eugene Riley Berry (December 7, 1891 – November 28, 1968) was an American football player and collegiate athletics coach. He is credited with founding the athletic department at Sam Houston State University–then known as Sam Houston Normal Institute–in 1914. He served as the school's head football coach (1914–1917, 1919) and head men's basketball coach (1917–1919).

Berry played college football at the University of Texas at Austin, earning letters in 1912 and 1913.

Head coaching record

Football

References

External links
 

1891 births
1968 deaths
American football ends
Basketball coaches from Texas
Texas Longhorns football players
Sam Houston Bearkats football coaches
Sam Houston Bearkats men's basketball coaches
People from Cooke County, Texas
Players of American football from Texas